Marco Alonso Vela Reyes (born 10 October 1961) is a Mexican politician affiliated with the Institutional Revolutionary Party (PRI). From 2012 to 2015, he was a deputy of the LXII Legislature of the Mexican Congress representing Yucatán.

References

1961 births
Living people
Politicians from Yucatán (state)
Institutional Revolutionary Party politicians
21st-century Mexican politicians
Deputies of the LXII Legislature of Mexico
Members of the Chamber of Deputies (Mexico) for Yucatán